The 1960–61 AHL season was the 25th season of the American Hockey League. Seven teams played 72 games each in the schedule. The All-Star Game was not played, and put on hold until resurrected in the 1994–95 AHL season. The Springfield Indians finished first overall again in the regular season, and won their second Calder Cup championship.

Final standings
Note: GP = Games played; W = Wins; L = Losses; T = Ties; GF = Goals for; GA = Goals against; Pts = Points;

Scoring leaders

Note: GP = Games played; G = Goals; A = Assists; Pts = Points; PIM = Penalty minutes

 complete list

Calder Cup playoffs
First round
Springfield Indians defeated Cleveland Barons 4 games to 0.
Hershey Bears defeated Buffalo Bisons 3 games to 1.
Finals
Springfield Indians defeated Hershey Bears 4 games to 0, to win the Calder Cup. 
 list of scores

Trophy and award winners
Team awards

Individual awards

See also
List of AHL seasons

References
AHL official site
AHL Hall of Fame
HockeyDB

American Hockey League seasons
2
2